Yolanda Rose "LaLa" Brown (May 20, 1986 – October 16, 2007) was an American R&B singer best known for being featured on the track 
"S.E.X." with Lyfe Jennings, which reached No. 3 on the Billboard Hot R&B/Hip-Hop Songs chart and peaked at No. 37 on the Billboard Hot 100 in October 2006. Brown and her record producer JeTannue "Kool Aid" Clayborn were murdered on October 16, 2007 at a recording studio in Milwaukee, Wisconsin. The case remains unsolved.

Early life
Yolanda Rose "LaLa" Brown was born on May 20, 1986 in Milwaukee, Wisconsin to Maria and William Brown. Brown's mother is of Mexican descent. Her father is African American. She was the youngest of five children. Her parents had stated that she had a talent for entertainment "from her first steps, always singing and dancing around the house." Therefore, it was no surprise to those who knew her when she began to pursue a career in music. At the age of eleven, Brown started singing professionally, using the stage name "Pre-mere"; she often sang at weddings and, later, various bars. She attended Frederick Douglass Elementary School, Jackie Robinson Middle School, and Milwaukee High School of the Arts. At the age of 16, in 2002, Brown gave birth to a daughter, Amirah Airreal Brown. She also loved giving back to her community.

Career 
In fall 2005, Brown traveled to Atlanta, Georgia in hopes of furthering her career, believing there she would have a better chance to meet artists, producers, and songwriters who could assist her.  Brown finally got the big break she was hoping for when R&B singer-songwriter Lyfe Jennings asked her to be on his new track "S.E.X."  She was a featured singer and appeared in the music video. The track "S.E.X." was a cautionary tale warning adolescent girls about the pitfalls and dangers of unprotected sex and appeared on his second studio album The Phoenix. She then toured with Jennings, but was released following a disagreement with him.  In June 2007, Brown returned to Milwaukee, still set on becoming a solo artist and began working on her debut album. Brown recorded three songs, "I'm Feeling It", "Rescue Me", and "Give Them What They Want", the latter a song many believe is autobiographical. Those songs were all released prior to her death.

Death 
On October 19, 2007, Brown and her record producer/boyfriend, JeTannue "Kool-Aid" Clayborn, were discovered shot and killed by an unknown gunman in the Loud Enuff Productionz recording studio in Milwaukee. Both had been dead at least 3 days before they were discovered. Although autopsies were performed on both Brown and Clayborn, results were never released. Brown was survived by her mother, father, siblings, as well as her daughter.

Brown's funeral was held on October 25, 2007 at the Mason Temple Church of God in Christ, Milwaukee. Hundreds of people attended, including Lyfe Jennings. Burial followed at Graceland Cemetery in Milwaukee. The case was featured on America's Most Wanted in February 2010. On October 22, 2012, TV One aired a Celebrity Crime Files episode about La La Brown's life and death. As of May 2022, the case has not been solved and police continue to search for a suspect and motive for the killings.

See also 
 List of homicides in Wisconsin

References

Further reading

External links

La La Brown at Last.fm

1986 births
2007 deaths
2007 murders in the United States
20th-century American musicians
21st-century American musicians
20th-century African-American women singers
American musicians of Mexican descent
Singers from Wisconsin
Musicians from Milwaukee
People murdered in Wisconsin
Unsolved murders in the United States
Murdered African-American people
Murdered Mexican Americans
20th-century American singers
20th-century American women singers
21st-century American women musicians
American murder victims
Deaths by firearm in Wisconsin
Burials in Wisconsin
21st-century African-American women
21st-century African-American musicians